The 2019 North Devon District Council election took place on 2 May 2019 to elect members of North Devon District Council in England. This was on the same day as other local elections. The whole council was up for election on new boundaries.

Summary

Election result

|-

Ward Results

Barnstaple Central

Barnstaple with Pilton

Barnstaple with Westacott

Bickington

Bishops Nympton

Bratton Fleming

Braunton East

Braunton West & Georgeham

Chittlehampton

The election in Chittlehampton ward (1 councillor) was postponed due to the death of independent candidate Walter White.

Chulmleigh

Combe Martin

Fremington

Heanton Punchardon

Ilfracombe East

Ilfracombe West

Instow

Landkey

Lynton & Lynmouth

Marwood

Mortehoe

Newport

North Molton

Roundswell

South Molton

Witheridge

By-elections

References 

North Devon
North Devon District Council elections
2010s in Devon
May 2019 events in the United Kingdom